Stanisław Witkiewicz (8 May 1851 – 5 September 1915) was a Polish painter, art theoretician, and amateur architect, known for his creation of "Zakopane Style".

Life 
Witkiewicz was born in the Samogitian village of Poszawsze, present-day Lithuania, in the lands of the partitioned Polish–Lithuanian Commonwealth, ruled at the time by the Russian Empire.

As an adolescent, he spent several years in Siberian Tomsk, where his parents and two older siblings were exiled for their support of the January Uprising. He was a student at the Academy of Fine Arts in Saint Petersburg (1868–1871) and furthered his education in Munich (1872–1875). During his stay in Munich, he befriended painters Aleksander Gierymski, Józef Chełmoński and Henryk Siemiradzki.

In 1875, he moved to Warsaw and set up a painting workshop in the laundry at the Hotel Europejski. In 1884, he married Maria Pietrzkiewicz. The pair had a son, Stanisław Ignacy. The son's godmother was the internationally famous actress Helena Modjeska, whom the elder Witkiewicz in 1876 had nearly accompanied to California in the United States.

In 1884–1887, Witkiewicz worked as the artistic director of "Wędrowiec" weekly, for which he wrote a series of  articles concerning the values of a work of art and the role of art critics (published in book form under the title  "Painting and criticism among us", Sztuka i krytyka u nas, in 1891 and 1899). In 1887, he held the same position in "Kłosy" magazine.

In 1886, he visited Zakopane for the first time. He developed a fascination with the Tatras, the Podhale highlanders and their vernacular traditions. His ambition became to create a Polish national style based on the highlanders' art, which he considered quintessentially Polish.

He formulated the Zakopane Style (styl zakopiański) (also known as Witkiewicz Style (styl witkiewiczowski)) in architecture, in which he designed homes and interiors for well-off, artistically-minded Poles. He was strongly associated with Zakopane and promoted it in the art community.

Witkiewicz had strong views against formal education: "school is completely at odds with the psychological make-up of human beings". He applied this principle in his son's upbringing and was disappointed when the 20-year-old Witkacy chose to enroll at the Academy of Fine Arts in Kraków.

In 1908, suffering from tuberculosis, the elder Witkiewicz left his family in Zakopane and relocated to Lovran, a fashionable resort in what was then Austria-Hungary, which today is in Croatia. He died there in 1915.

His first monographic art exhibition was staged in Zachęta Fine Arts Society in 1927. His son, Stanisław Ignacy Witkiewicz, became a famous painter, playwright, novelist and philosopher, also known (from the conflation of his surname and middle name) by the pseudonym "Witkacy."

Selected publications 
 "Policja a sztuka" ["The police and art"] (1902),
 "Chrześcijaństwo i katechizm. O nauce religii w szkołach galicyjskich" ["Christianity and the catechism. About the teaching of religion in Galician schools"] (1904), 
 "Wallenrodyzm czy znikczemnienie" ["Wallenrod-ism or becoming ignoble"] (published in "Kultura Polski" 1917, a fragment of the work "Studium o duszy polskiej po 1863 roku" ["A study of the Polish soul after 1863"],
 "Przełom" ["Turning point"],
 "Życie, etyka i rewolucja" ["Life, ethics and revolution"], 
 "Na przełęczy. Wrażenia i obrazy z Tatr" ["On the mountain pass. Impressions and images from the Tatra mountains"] (1891, first published in "Tygodnik Illustrowany" 1889–1890),
 "Po latach" ["Years later"] (1905), 
 "Z Tatr" ["From the Tatra mountains"] (1907),
  Monographs: "Juliusz Kossak" (1900), "Aleksander Gierymski" (1903), "Matejko" (1908).

Selected paintings

See also 
 List of Poles
 Bronisław Linke

References

External links 

 

Stanisław Witkiewicz at Culture.pl

1851 births
1915 deaths
People from Kelmė District Municipality
People from Kovno Governorate
20th-century deaths from tuberculosis
19th-century Polish painters
19th-century Polish male artists
20th-century Polish painters
20th-century Polish male artists
Polish male writers
19th-century Polish architects
People from the Russian Empire of Polish descent
Polish male painters
Tuberculosis deaths in Croatia
People from Zakopane
20th-century Polish architects